Brad Fay (born June 16, 1964) is a Canadian sportscaster for Rogers Sportsnet. Fay began his sportscasting career in 1997 as a weekend sports anchor for BCTV and has also worked in the radio industry calling junior hockey games. He co-hosted the 2010 Vancouver Olympics coverage for Sportsnet. Fay also worked in the newspaper industry.

He has a sister named Erin Farncomb (Fay).

References

1964 births
Living people
People from Vancouver
Journalists from British Columbia
Canadian radio journalists
Canadian television journalists
Canadian television sportscasters